SM*SH (stands for Seven Man as Seven Heroes), is an Indonesian boyband established by Starsignal on April 10, 2010. It consists of Rafael Landry Tanubrata, Bisma Karisma, Rangga Dewamoela, Dicky Muhammad Prasetya, Muhammad Reza Anugerah and Muhammad Ilham Fauzi.

100% Ampuh Awards

|-
| 2013
| SM*SH
| Best Boyband
| 
|-

Anugerah MeleTOP Era
Presented from 2001 to 2007 during six years of vacuum, the Anugerah MeleTOP Era (formerly Anugerah Era) are an awards to recognize local celebrities in various platforms, such as music, radio, television, film and digital in Malaysia, based on website voting and SMS,

|-
| 2014
| SM*SH
| Best Regional Artist
| 
|-

Anugerah Musik Indonesia
The Anugerah Musik Indonesia (English translation: Indonesian Music Awards), is an annual Indonesian major music awards. They have been compared to the American Grammy Awards and British Brit Awards. The award was formalized in 1997 by ASIRI (Association of Indonesia Recording Industry), PAPPRI (Association of Indonesian Singers, Songwriters and Music Record Producers), and KCI (Copyright Office of Indonesia). It is the highest music award given to outstanding artists in Indonesia.

|-
| rowspan= "4" | 2012
| rowspan= "2" | "I Heart You"
| Best of the Best Newcomer
| 
|-
| Best Vocal Group Production Work
| 
|-
| rowspan= "2" | SM*SH
| Best of the Best Album
| 
|-
| Best Pop Album
| 
|-
| rowspan= "2" | 2013
| SM*SH
| Best Pop Vocal Group
| 
|-
| "Patah Hati"
| Best Vocal Group Production Work
| 
|-

Anugerah Planet Muzik
The Anugerah Planet Muzik (English translations: Planet Music Awards) is an award ceremony for engaged artist in the Malay and Indonesian language music world. It is including singers from allied country, which are Singapore, Malaysia and Indonesia.

|-
| 2014
| "Hello" (feat. Stacy)
| Best Collaboration (Artist)
| 
|-

Bintang RPTI Awards

|-
| 2011
| rowspan= "2" | SM*SH
| Favorite Star Advertisement
| 
|-
| 2012
| Celebrity Top Rating of the Year
| 
|-

Dahsyatnya Awards
The Dahsyatnya Awards are annual awards presented by the daily Indonesian TV show Dahsyat that airs on RCTI. SM*SH has received two awards from 7 nominations.

|-
| 2011
| rowspan= "3" | SM*SH
| Outstanding Stage Act
| 
|-
| 2012
| rowspan= "2" | Outstanding Boyband 
| 
|-
| rowspan= "3" | 2013
| 
|-
| rowspan= "2" | "Ada Cinta"
| Outstanding Video Clip
| 
|-
| Outstanding Video Clip Director
| 
|-
| rowspan= "2" | 2014
| "Rindu Ini"
| Outstanding Song
| 
|-
| SM*SH
| Outstanding Boyband/Girlband
| 
|-

Grazia Glitz & Glam Awards

|-
| 2011
| SM*SH
| The Hottest Artist
| 
|-

Inbox Awards
First established in 2008, the Inbox Awards are an awards were presented by Indonesian TV station SCTV for talent artist in music and entertainment based on audience votes. SM*SH has received twelve awards from 19 nominations.

|-
| rowspan= "4" | 2011
| rowspan= "3" | SM*SH
| Most Inbox Boyband
| 
|-
| Most Inbox Newcomer
| 
|-
| Most Inbox Appearance
| 
|-
| "I Heart You"
| Most Inbox Song
| 
|-
| rowspan= "4" | 2012
| rowspan= "2" | SM*SH
| Most Inbox Boyband 
| 
|-
| Most Inbox Appearance
| 
|-
| "Ahhh"
| Most Inbox Song
| 
|-
| SM*SHBLAST
| Most Inbox Fanbase
| 
|-
| rowspan= "3" | 2013
| rowspan= "2" | SM*SH
| Most Inbox Boyband
| 
|-
| Most Inbox Appearance
| 
|-
| SM*SHBLAST
| Most Inbox Fanbase
| 
|-
| rowspan= "4" | 2014
| SM*SH
| Most Inbox Boyband
| 
|-
| Rafael SM*SH
| rowspan= "2" | Most Inbox Host
| 
|-
| Rangga SM*SH
| 
|-
| SM*SHBLAST
| Most Inbox Fanbase
| 
|-
| rowspan= "4" | 2015
| rowspan= "2" | SM*SH
| Most Inbox Boyband/Girlband
| 
|-
| Most Inbox Darling Social Media Artist
| 
|-
| Rangga SM*SH
| Most Inbox Host
| 
|-
| SM*SHBLAST
| Most Inbox Fanbase
| 
|-

Indigo Digital Music Awards
The Indigo Digital Music Awards is an award given to artists, who have their song used most as ringtone tones. SM*SH has received two awards from 3 nominations.

|-
| rowspan= "3" | 2011
| rowspan= "2" | SM*SH
| Best Newcomer
| 
|-
| Best Duo/Group
| 
|-
| "I Heart You"
| Best Video
| 
|-

Infotainment Awards
The Infotainment Awards is an award presented by SCTV since 2012. SM*SH has received one award from 5 nominations.

|-
| rowspan= "3" | 2012
| rowspan= "4" | SM*SH
| Most Infotainment Celebrity
| 
|-
| Most Infotainment Newcomer Celebrity
| 
|-
| Most Infotainment Dressed Celebrity
| 
|-
| 2014
| rowspan= "2" | Most Fashionable Male Celebrity
| 
|-
| 2015
| Rangga SM*SH
| 
|-

Insert Awards

|-
| 2011
| rowspan= "3" | SM*SH
| The Rising Star
| 
|-
| 2012
| rowspan= "2" | Celebrity of the Year
| 
|-
| 2013
| 
|-

KLIK! Awards

|-
| 2011
| "I Heart You"
| Best Phenomenal Singer Artist
| 
|-
| 2013
| "Rindu Ini"
| Favorite Pop Video
| 
|-

Mnet Asian Music Awards
Mnet Asian Music Awards (commonly abbreviated as MAMA), is a major annual K-pop music award from Mnet Media. SM*SH has received one award.

|-
| 2013
| SM*SH
| Best Asian Artist (Indonesia)
| 
|-

Nickelodeon Indonesia Kids' Choice Awards
The Nickelodeon Indonesia Kids' Choice Awards is Indonesian version of Nickelodeon Kids' Choice Awards, held since 2008 in Jakarta. SM*SH has received two awards from 4 nominations.

|-
| rowspan= "2" | 2011
| rowspan= "4" | SM*SH
| Favorite Duo/Group/Band
| 
|-
| Slime Star
| 
|-
| 2012
| Favorite Boyband
| 
|-
| 2013
| Favorite Boyband/Girlband
| 
|-

Panasonic Gobel Awards
The Panasonic Gobel Awards is an award presented to television programs and individuals, based on poll results. The poll was originally conducted by the Indonesian tabloid Citra, but was taken over by Nielsen Media Research in 2004. SM*SH has received one award.

|-
| 2013
| SM*SH Ngabuburit Season 2
| Favorite Hobby and Lifestyle Program
| 
|-

SCTV Awards
The SCTV Awards is an award given by the Indonesian television station SCTV, based on audience votes. SM*SH has received one award from 5 nominations.

|-
| 2012
| rowspan= "3" | SM*SH
| rowspan= "3" | Famous Boyband/Girlband
| 
|-
| 2013
| 
|-
| rowspan= "3" | 2014
| 
|-
| Rafael SM*SH
| rowspan= "2" | Famous Presenter
| 
|-
| Rangga SM*SH
| 
|-

SCTV Music Awards
The SCTV Music Awards is an award given by Indonesian television station SCTV to popular songs, albums, and artists based on audience votes  through SMS. SM*SH has received six awards from 7 nominations.

|-
| rowspan= "3" | 2012
| rowspan= "2" | SM*SH
| Most Famous Newcomer Album
| 
|-
| Most Famous Boyband Album
| 
|-
| "Senyum Semangat"
| Most Famous Song
| 
|-
| rowspan= "2" | 2013
| SM*SH
| Most Famous Boyband
| 
|-
| "Rindu Ini"
| Most Famous Song
| 
|-
| 2014
| rowspan= "2" | SM*SH
| rowspan= "2" | Most Famous Boyband/Girlband
| 
|-
| 2015
| 
|-

Yahoo! OMG Awards
Presented by Yahoo! Indonesia on 2012, the Yahoo! OMG Awards are an annual online awards have been presenting to celebrity who recognize as appreciated in entertainment. It is based on voted by fans in Yahoo! website.

|-
| 2012
| SM*SH
| Favorite Group
| 
|-

YKS Romantic Awards
The YKS Romantic Awards is an awards show presented by Yuk Keep Smile, a TV show which is broadcast on Trans TV. The awards show is held on February 14 every year to coincide with Valentine's Day. SM*SH has received one award.

|-
| 2014
| SM*SH
| Most Awesome Appearance
| 
|-

References

Lists of awards received by Indonesian musician
Lists of awards received by musical group